Kalateh-ye Said may refer to:
 Kalateh-ye Said, Razavi Khorasan
 Kalateh-ye Said, South Khorasan